Sinais de Vida is a Portuguese medical drama television series broadcast by RTP. It has 80 episodes and started airing on 14 January 2013 on RTP1.

Cast
Dalila Carmo
Joaquim Horta
São José Correia
Rosa do Canto
Álvaro Faria
Maria Carolina Pacheco
Francisco Ferreira

References

External links

2013 Portuguese television series debuts
Medical television series
Rádio e Televisão de Portugal original programming
2010s Portuguese television series